Navajo Run is a 1964 Western film released by American International Pictures, produced and directed by as well as starring Johnny Seven.

Cast
 Johnny Seven as Mathew Whitehawk
 Warren Kemmerling as Luke Grog
 Virginia Vincent as Sarah Grog
 Ron Soble as Jesse Grog

Plot summary 
Mathew Whitehawk, a "half-breed Navajo," is bitten by a rattlesnake and seeks aid at the ranch of Sarah and Luke Grog. Mathew is nursed back to health on the orders of Luke. It turns out that Luke hates Native Americans. He sets Mathew loose in the forest without food or water, and hunts him down as he has done with other Native Americans. The film ends with Mathew killing Luke.

Legacy 
American International Pictures: A Comprehensive Filmography describes Navajo Run as an "obscure little curio" that was a retelling of The Most Dangerous Game with a "white racist hunting down Indians as a hobby." The film had little impact at the time of its limited release, and after theatrical showings it was shown on TV in Canada.

External links

References 

1964 films
1964 directorial debut films
1964 Western (genre) films
American black-and-white films
American International Pictures films
American Western (genre) films
Films with screenplays by Jo Heims
1960s English-language films
1960s American films